Dora Jelínková (5 August 1949 – 20 March 2007) was a Czech volleyball player. She competed in the women's tournament at the 1972 Summer Olympics.

References

1949 births
2007 deaths
Czech women's volleyball players
Olympic volleyball players of Czechoslovakia
Volleyball players at the 1972 Summer Olympics
Sportspeople from Brno